The 1997 Buffalo Bulls football team represented the University at Buffalo in the 1997 NCAA Division I-AA football season. The Bulls offense scored 229 points while the defense allowed 421 points.

Schedule

References

Buffalo
Buffalo Bulls football seasons
Buffalo Bulls football